Nicholas D'Amour is a recurve archer from the United States Virgin Islands. He competed in Archery at the 2020 Summer Olympics.

D'Amour attends the University of the Virgin Islands.

References

Living people
2001 births
United States Virgin Islands male archers
Archers at the 2020 Summer Olympics
Olympic archers of the United States Virgin Islands
University of the Virgin Islands alumni